One of the Boys is an American sitcom created by Blake Hunter and Martin Cohan that aired six episodes on NBC from April 15 to May 20, 1989. It was one of the only American primetime programs to star a Latin American woman—María Conchita Alonso—that decade. She features as Maria Conchita Navarro, a Venezuelan immigrant to the United States who begins working in the office of a small construction company and marries its widowed owner, Mike Lukowski (Robert Clohessy). Five production companies oversaw filming at Sunset Gower Studios in Hollywood, where delays prevented critics from watching a preview in advance of the premiere. Reviews referred to the concept, script, and Alonso's acting. The mid-season replacement received inconsistent Nielsen ratings and was not renewed for a second season by NBC.

Cast and characters

The sitcom One of the Boys follows Maria Conchita Navarro (María Conchita Alonso), a Venezuelan immigrant to the United States pursuing the American Dream by leaving her job as a waitress and becoming a bookkeeper at the Lukowski Construction Company in Queens, New York. The actress and character are similar in name, personality, and country of origin. David Walstad of The Philadelphia Inquirer described Navarro as Alonso's alter ego, The Miami Heralds Juan Carlos Coto deemed her autobiographical, and Alonso said "the character is just like" her. In contrast to the stereotypical portrayal of Latin Americans as poor and uneducated, Navarro is a clever woman with class who speaks English. She is from a well-off family but wants to achieve her goals without their assistance, which is exemplified in her opinionated nature and motorcycle riding. According to Alonso, Navarro is a "full of life, tomboyish, yet feminine" woman. Amy Aquino plays her best friend Bernice DeSalvo, a waitress the actress considered a wisecracker who "has trouble getting dates".

Navarro's love interest is Mike Lukowski (Robert Clohessy), the small business owner of the Lukowski Construction Company and recently widowed father of three boys: 20-year-old Luke Lukowski (Michael DeLuise), 18-year-old Steve Lukowski (Billy Morrissette), and 13-year-old Nick Lukowski (Justin Whalin). Luke works on the company's job sites with foreman Ernie (Dan Hedaya) while Steve and Nick attend school. Mike and Maria's relationship quickly becomes romantic and they wed in the fifth episode.

Background
Few lead roles existed for Latin American women on late 1980s primetime television in the United States. While I Married Dora—a sitcom featuring a Central American woman who marries her American employer—aired in 1987, it received low viewership. Television network NBC sought to expand its comedy programming by broadcasting new series starring Latin Americans such as Alonso, who made her United States television debut on One of the Boys. The Venezuelan singer and actress had received two Grammy Award nominations and starred in the films Moscow on the Hudson (1984) and The Running Man (1987). Alonso was initially averse to acting on television because the films she was doing gave her freedom to explore other opportunities after a couple of months. Following years of rejecting her manager's insistence she enter the field, Alonso signed with television producer Fred Silverman in 1988, who thought she could equal the success Roseanne Barr achieved on Roseanne. Alonso took the lead role in One of the Boys because she saw herself in the lead character and thought she could receive better movie roles afterward.

Production
Tom Palmer developed the series while Silverman executive produced it with creators Blake Hunter and Martin Cohan, who worked on the ABC television series Who's the Boss? Bob Ezrin and Michael Tavera wrote the theme music while Jonathan Wolff composed other sound effects, and Castle Bryant Johnsen designed the title sequence. ELP Communications, Stiefel-Philips Entertainment, The Fred Silverman Company, Hunter-Cohan Productions, and Columbia Pictures Television managed the show's production.

Originally scheduled to start in late February 1989, filming began in mid-March before an audience at Sunset Gower Studios in Hollywood. Episode tapings occurred on Tuesdays following six days of rehearsals. Script issues plagued production, and the premiere was filmed again one week before its broadcast. To prevent viewers from thinking of her as "another actress trying to sing", Alonso kept her singing career separate from the show and does not sing in it.

Episodes

Broadcast history
One of the Boys received little publicity before its premiere; the production delays prevented critics from watching a preview. A mid-season replacement for NBC in the 1988–89 United States television season, the show would air a second season starting in September 1989 if its trial run was well-received. The sitcom debuted at 9:30 p.m. ET on Saturday, April 15, 1989, following The Golden Girls in what The Palm Beach Post described as a "solid gold ratings spot". It then moved up to 8 p.m. for two weeks—"a much more difficult ratings spot" according to the Wisconsin State Journal—taking the regular time slot of 227. The last three episodes aired at 8:30 p.m. leading into The Golden Girls. Aside from NBC, the program aired on BCTV in the Canadian province of British Columbia.

The Los Angeles Times Syndicate deemed the premiere's performance as one of the top 20 highest-rated primetime programs in the week it aired "respectable". After the second episode only made the top 50, Tom Green of USA Today said the show's ratings "results haven't been that good". The six episodes ranked 17th, 49th, 55th, 42nd, 37th, and 48th, respectively. NBC canceled One of the Boys on May 15, 1989, as it announced a schedule for the 1989–90 television season. According to Alonso, it was not renewed because the network "didn't think it would be a long-running hit". Clohessy remarked their "on-screen relationship ... would have kept evolving" if a second season were filmed, and Aquino's character would have assumed the role of bookkeeper at the company.

Critical reception
One of the Boys concept and writing were subject to critical commentary. King Features Syndicate's Steven H. Scheuer and Don Davies of the Wisconsin State Journal considered both aspects ordinary. According to Variety, the series simply "reintroduce[s] the theme of the single parent raising his kids". A writer for The Kingston Whig-Standard thought the program was predictable because they felt Mike and Maria seemed destined for marriage by the end of the first episode. Hester Riches of the Vancouver Sun said it was "certainly not worth staying home Saturday night to catch".

Critics also commented on Alonso's acting. Scheuer stated she was funnier than her script, and Riches remarked she makes the show "genuinely funny". According to Davies, Alonso "manages switcheroos on tired plotlines". In contrast, Variety considered her enthusiasm unconvincing.

References

Notes

Footnotes

Citations

 
 
 
 
 
 
 
 
 
 
 
 
 
 
 
 
 
 
 
 
 
 
 
 
 
 
 
 
 
 
 
 
 
 
 
 
 
 
 
 

1989 American television series debuts
1989 American television series endings
1980s American sitcoms
NBC original programming
English-language television shows
Television series about marriage